Craig Field  is a public airport four miles southeast of Selma, in Dallas County, Alabama. The FAA's National Plan of Integrated Airport Systems for 2011–2015 categorized it as a general aviation facility.
It was previously the U.S. Air Force Craig Air Force Base, closed in 1977.

Facilities

Its single runway, 15/33, is 8,002 by 150 feet (2,439 x 46 m) asphalt/concrete. In the year ending November 2, 2009 the airport had 38,550 aircraft operations, average 105 per day: 89% general aviation, 10% military, and 1% air taxi. 8 single-engine aircraft were then based at the airport.

The former USAF control tower from what was Craig Air Force Base remains, but as of 2007 it was unmanned, with UNICOM being used as a common traffic advisory frequency (CTAF). Both parallel  runways still exist, but only one is in use. The Craig VORTAC and the Instrument Landing System (ILS) for the current Runway 33 remain operational. The airport's military traffic is primarily Navy and USAF aircraft inbound to the L3 Communications/Vertex Aerospace facility.

The former military family housing was sold to individual owners shortly after base closure and has decayed, compared to its previous military occupants.

Multiple civilian government and corporate tenants have taken up residency. The former on-base elementary school continues as the civilian-run Craig Elementary, and the former base golf course continues as the Craig Golf Course and Driving Range. The Alabama Highway Patrol (AHP) operates both its training academy and its headquarters for AHP's F Troop at Craig.

In 2015, Marine One used Craig Field when President Barack Obama visited Selma's Edmund Pettus Bridge.

Craig Field may never have had airline service; Selma's previous airport saw Delta, then Southern flights from 1952 to 1963.

References

External links 

 
 

Airports in Dallas County, Alabama